Thumba Equatorial Rocket Launching Station (TERLS) is an Indian spaceport established on 21 November 1963. Operated by the Indian Space Research Organisation (ISRO), it is located in Thumba, Thiruvananthapuram, Kerala, which is near the southern tip of mainland India, very close to earth's magnetic equator. It is currently used by ISRO for launching sounding rockets.

The first rockets were assembled in former St Louis High School, which houses now a space museum. The local Bishop, Rev. Peter Bernard Periera, Bishop of Trivandrum, Vincent Victor Dereere (a Belgian) and district collector Madhavan Nair were instrumental in acquiring a large parcel of land measuring 600 acres from coastal community. The Bishop Rev. Periera had given away the prayer hall and bishop's room in the local church for scientific pursuits of A. P. J. Abdul Kalam. Then Minister of State for External Affairs, Lakshmi N. Menon helped a lot in smoothing the bureaucratic hurdles before the project at Delhi. H.G.S. Murthy was appointed as the first Director of Thumba Equatorial Rocket Launching Station.

The sounding rocket systems for the launch were loaned by NASA and payload was provided by CNES. The event did not gain the global media attention it deserved due to the Assassination of John F. Kennedy that happened in the following day.

Location
Thumba's location at 8°32'34" N and 76°51'32" E is ideal for low-altitude, upper atmosphere and ionosphere studies. Thumba is a small fishing village situated close to the Thiruvananthapuram airport in Kerala. Thumba is also one of the farthest points from Pakistan, China, Afghanistan and Bangladesh.

References

External links

Official website of Vikram Sarabhai Space Centre

Space programme of India
Spaceports
Rocket launch sites in India
Organisations based in Thiruvananthapuram
1963 establishments in Kerala
Buildings and structures in Thiruvananthapuram district
Transport infrastructure completed in 1963